CeeLo Green Is Thomas Callaway is the sixth solo studio album by American singer CeeLo Green. It was released on June 26, 2020, via Easy Eye Sound and BMG Rights Management. Recording sessions took place at Easy Eye Sound Studios in Nashville, Tennessee. Production was handled by Dan Auerbach.

Track listing

Personnel

Thomas Callaway – vocals
Ashley Wilcoxson – background vocals
Leisa Hans – background vocals
Dan Auerbach – background vocals (tracks: 3, 4, 11), guitar, bass guitar and percussion (track 5), Mellotron (track 7), engineering, producer
Bobby Wood – electric piano and Wurlitzer (tracks: 1, 4–8, 11, 12), electric guitar (tracks: 2–5, 9, 10), bells (track 4), Hammond B3 and organ (track 5)
Ray Jacildo – Hammond B3, glockenspiel and vibraphone (tracks: 2, 5, 8–10), organ (tracks: 3, 4, 6, 11, 12), bells (tracks: 4, 7, 11), synthesizer (track 7), harpsichord (tracks: 11, 12)
Mike Rojas – piano, harpsichord (tracks: 1, 2, 8–10, 12), clavinet (tracks: 2, 6–10, 12), vibraphone and glockenspiel (tracks: 2, 3, 8–10, 12), bells (track 7)
Billy Sanford – electric guitar (tracks: 1, 2, 4, 6–12), electric piano and Wurlitzer (track 3), guitar (track 9)
Russ Pahl – electric guitar, sitar (track 5)
Dave Roe – bass
Matt Combs – strings (tracks: 1, 5, 8–10)
Gene Chrisman – drums, percussion (tracks: 2, 8–12)
Chris St. Hillaire – percussion (tracks: 3, 8–10, 12)
Roy Agee – trombone (tracks: 5, 12), horn (tracks: 6, 9, 10)
Caleb VanBuskirk – engineering
Allen Parker – engineering
Alex Skelton – engineering
Trey Keller – engineering
Josh Ditty – engineering
Ryan Smith – engineering

References

External links

2020 albums
CeeLo Green albums
Albums produced by Dan Auerbach